Matt or Matthew Phillips may refer to:
 Matt Phillips (born 1991), Scottish international footballer (Blackpool FC, QPR, West Brom)
 Matthew Phillips (rugby union) (born 1975), New Zealand-born Italian rugby union footballer
 Matthew Phillips (climber) (born 2000),  British paraclimber
 Matthew Phillips (ice hockey) (born 1998), Canadian professional ice hockey player